Sola HK is a handball club from Sola, Rogaland, Norway. The women's team currently competes in REMA 1000-ligaen.

Results

Norway
REMA 1000-ligaen
Bronze: 2020/21, 2021/22
Norwegian Cup
 Finalist: 2020, 2022/23

Team

Current squad
Squad for the 2022–23 season 

Goalkeeper
 1  Ine Skartveit Bergsvik
 16  Amalie Frøland
 30  Rinka Duijndam
Wingers
RW
 15  Maja Magnussen
 18  Lea Sigtrudur Nilsen
LW 
 3  Guro Berland Husebø
 4  Maren Eiken Ravndal
 77  Camilla Herrem
Line players
 8  Martine Wolff (c)
 9  Kaja Horst Haugseng
 10  Vilde Ueland 
 49  Hege Holgersen Danielsen

Back players
LB
 7  Augunn Gudmestad
 10  Lene Kristiansen Tveiten
 25  Merlinda Qorraj
CB
 11  Frøydis Seierstad Wiik
 17  Kristiane Knutsen 
 20  Live Rushfeldt Deila
RB
 22  Kristina Novak
 24  Martha Barka

Transfers
Transfers for the 2023–24 season.

Joining
 
Leaving
  Rinka Duijndam (GK)

Technical staff
 Head coach: Steffen Stegavik
 Assistant coach: Ole André Lerang 
 Assistant coach: Kjetil Aanestad

Notable former club and national team players

  Hilde Østbø
  Lene Tønnesen
  Maja Breznik
  Mimi Kopperud Slevigen
  Tonje Nøstvold
  Ida Bjørndalen Karlsson
  Ingrid Ødegård
  Anja Hammerseng-Edin

Notable former club players

  Gro Engstrøm
  Line Ellertsen
  Silje Bolset
  Trine Fjelde Olsen
  Monica Meland
  Marianne Økland
  Mette Ommundsen
  Marianne Mellemstrand
  Lene Andersen Ege
  Olaug Iren Lode
  Susan Andersen
  Susann Jøraanstad
  Monica Nesvik
  Linn Merete Rosenlund
  Malene Solheim
  Katrine Høyland
  Heidi Samuelsen
  Nina Stokland
  Hege Bakken Wahlquist
  Tonje Haug Lerstad
  Kimberley Ewanovich
  Alicja Lucyna Zacharska
  Esmeralda Fetahovic

European record

References

External links
 Official website
 Official Topphåndball website

Norwegian handball clubs
Handball clubs established in 1934
Sport in Rogaland
1934 establishments in Norway
Sola, Norway